The 16th European Women's Artistic Gymnastics Championships were held in Moscow, Soviet Union, in 1987.

Medalists

References 

1987
European Artistic Gymnastics Championships
1987 in European sport
International gymnastics competitions hosted by the Soviet Union
1987 in Soviet sport